Hopes and Past Desires is an EP by Rafael Anton Irisarri, pressed by American label Immune (distributed by Thrill Jockey). It was released worldwide as 7" vinyl on January 27, 2009.

Track listing 

All tracks written, arranged, and produced by Rafael Anton Irisarri, except Strings on Hopes and Past Desires (arranged, written and performed by Danny Norbury)

 "Hopes and Past Desires"
 "Watching As She Reels"

Personnel 

 Rafael Anton Irisarri — Production, mixing; synthesizer, piano, acoustic, electronic and non-conventional instruments
 Danny Norbury - Strings on Hopes and Past Desires
 Nan Schwarz - Cello on Watching As She Reels
 Paco Barba — Artwork design

References 

Rafael Anton Irisarri albums
2009 EPs